Ophichthus genie is an eel in the family Ophichthidae (worm/snake eels). It was described by John E. McCosker in 1999. It is a marine, deep water-dwelling eel which is known from the Indo-Pacific, including New Caledonia and Maldives.

The species epithet "genie" was given in honour of ichthyologist Eugenia B. Böhlke. (1929-2001), of the Academy of Natural Sciences of Philadelphia.

References

genie
Taxa named by John E. McCosker
Fish described in 1999